The DM-39 is a German anti-personnel, cylindrical-shaped and plastic-made blast mine intended for emplacement under an anti-tank mine. It is pressure initiated and has a clockwork delayed arming mechanism, making it suitable for its anti-lift role. A secondary fuze well is located on the lower side of the mine, allowing for use of a secondary anti-disturbance fuze. The mine measures 100 by 40 mm with a 300-gram TNT/RDX explosive charge, with three variants of the same dimensions, the DM-39A1, the DM-68 and the DM-68A1.

The DM-39A1 is the metal-case version of the DM-68, a plastic-case training mine with a smoke charge device instead of an explosive one.

References

 

Anti-personnel mines
Land mines of Germany